Tetrabarbital (INN; Butysal, Butysedal, Tetramal) is a barbiturate derivative used as a hypnotic.

See also 
 Barbiturate
 Pentobarbital

References 

Barbiturates
Hypnotics
Pyrimidines
Sedatives
GABAA receptor positive allosteric modulators